Angela Deneece Alsobrooks (born February 23, 1971) is an American lawyer and politician. A member of the Democratic Party, she was elected county executive of Prince George's County, Maryland, in 2018 after serving two terms as state's attorney for the county.

Early life and education
Alsobrooks was born to father James Alsobrooks, a retired newspaper distributor for The Washington Post, and mother Patricia Alsobrooks (née James). She was raised in Camp Springs, Maryland, and attended Benjamin Banneker High School in Washington, D.C.. Alsobrooks earned her bachelor's in public policy at Duke University in 1993, and her J.D. degree from the University of Maryland School of Law in 1996. She was admitted to the Maryland Bar in 1996.

Early career 
After graduating, she worked as an assistant state's attorney in Prince George's County from 1997 to 2002, where she was assigned to handle domestic violence cases. In 2002, she left the state's attorney office to become education liaison for then-County Executive Jack B. Johnson. In 2003, Alsobrooks was appointed executive director of the county revenue authority.

Alsobrooks was motivated to run for Prince George's state's attorney after reading a magazine profile about District Attorney of San Francisco Kamala Harris, soon after reading her book Smart on Crime. Harris supported Alsobrooks' campaign for state's attorney.

Prince George's State's Attorney

Alsobrooks was first elected Prince George's state's attorney in 2010 and subsequently re-elected in 2014. During her time in office, the violent crime rate in the county declined by 50 percent, in line with national trends. Alsobrooks sought and secured funding to increase the number of attorneys in the office and increased conviction rates. She also worked with California Attorney General Kamala Harris to implement a program to reduce recidivism in Prince George's County, mirroring a similar program Harris introduced in California.

Prince George's County Executive

Following the outgoing County Executive being term limited, Alsobrooks announced her intention to run for County Executive on July 28, 2017. During the primary, she was endorsed by The Washington Post, U.S. Senator Chris Van Hollen, U.S. Representatives Anthony Brown and Steny Hoyer, and numerous labor unions. Alsobrooks won the Democratic primary election with 61.79% of the vote, defeating eight other candidates, including former Congresswoman Donna Edwards and State Senator C. Anthony Muse. Alsobrooks faced Republican Jerry Mathis in the general election, who later dropped out and endorsed Alsobrooks on August 29, 2018, allowing her to run without any formal opposition and earning 98.9% of the vote. Upon election, Alsobrooks became the first woman to be elected County Executive for Prince George's County. She was sworn in as County Executive on December 3, 2018.

Alsobrooks was seen as a possible candidate for the 2022 Maryland gubernatorial election, but instead chose to run for re-election as county executive in 2022. She endorsed Wes Moore in the Democratic primary on March 5, 2022. In November 2022, following Moore's win in the general election, Alsobrooks was named as a co-chair on the transition teams of both Moore and Comptroller-elect Brooke Lierman.

Personal life
Alsobrooks is a single mother, giving birth to a daughter, Alexandria Alsobrooks-Laney, in 2005. She is a member of Delta Sigma Theta sorority, and is active in promoting breast cancer awareness. She is also a congregant at First Baptist Church of Glenarden.

Political positions

COVID-19 pandemic
On March 9, 2020, Alsobrooks announced that Prince George's County had recorded its first case of COVID-19. Alsobrooks opened the first COVID-19 testing site in the county at FedExField on March 27, 2020. Prince George's County was the county hardest hit by the COVID-19 pandemic, with 27 percent of the state's known cases and 24 percent of the confirmed deaths by April 2020.

In May 2020, Alsobrooks expressed caution about the state's potential plans to begin easing some COVID-19-related restrictions, saying "We'll do what we can. But we're going to also make decisions that are specific and tailored to the challenges that we have met here in Prince George's, because we already know this virus has impacted us in a unique way". Later that month, Alsobrooks joined almost every other county executive in sending a letter to Maryland Governor Larry Hogan warning that their jurisdictions "lack sufficient resources" to take the steps to fully reopen in the weeks ahead. Alsobrooks announced on May 28, 2020, that the county would begin its "incremental opening", and would form a "Prince George's Forward" task force to help the county recover from the pandemic going forward. In November 2020, Alsobrooks announced new capacity limits at bars, gyms, and restaurants in Prince George's County amid a spike in COVID-19 cases.

In January 2021, Alsobrooks announced that the county health department would cancel any vaccination appointments scheduled after February 9 as part of a "reset" after noticing that people from neighboring counties were crossing into Prince George's to get the COVID-19 vaccine. In February 2021, she launched a "Proud to be Protected" campaign with local hospitals and non-profits to tackle vaccine misinformation and encourage residents to get vaccinated, and later joined statewide efforts to do the same. In May 2021, Alsobrooks joined local leaders in sending a letter to Gov. Hogan encouraging him to impose a temporary statewide eviction moratorium to give local jurisdictions more time to set up rent relief programs. In August 2021, Alsobrooks re-instated the county's indoor mask mandate following an increase in COVID-19 cases from the Delta variant. The county's mask mandate was lifted on February 28, 2022.

Development initiatives
During her campaign, Alsobrooks said she would "work with the owners of the Redskins as well as with Maryland Governor Larry Hogan" to keep the Redskins stadium in Prince George's County. She also opposed a proposal to build a maglev train connecting Washington, D.C., to Baltimore, describing the proposal as "outright disrespect to Prince George's County" and a "discourteous project". In 2019, Alsobrooks stayed neutral on Gov. Hogan's proposal to take control of the federally-controlled Oxon Cove Park and Oxon Hill Farm to build a new stadium for the Redskins, saying that while the Redskins are a valued enterprise, she would not be willing to take funds from other higher priorities, such as education, public safety, health care and economic development, to keep the team from moving away. In 2021, Alsobrooks proposed developing a year-round sports and entertainment venue near FedExField as an incentive to keep the Washington Football Team in Maryland.

In February 2019, Alsobrooks introduced legislation to increase transparency on state road upkeep by publishing state schedules for upholding maintenance on state medians and litter pickup.

In May 2021, Alsobrooks sent a letter to Acting Federal Railroad Administrator Amit Bose and Maryland Transportation Secretary Greg Slater to voice their opposition to the D.C.–Baltimore maglev proposal, arguing that the construction would "tear through environmentally sensitive areas and that the 311-mile-an-hour train would cause vibrations and hurt property values". In late 2021, Alsobrooks launched programs to preserve and construct mixed-use development around the Blue Line and Purple Line projects.

Education
During her county executive campaign, Alsobrooks said that her administration would increase investment in pre-K education, career and technology education, and infrastructure improvement projects within the county's schools, with the goal of achieving universal pre-K for every child. In 2019, Alsobrooks announced that Prince George's County would use public-private partnerships to build and maintain several of the county's schools, making it the first jurisdiction in the United States to do so. In 2020, Alsobrooks testified in favor of legislation that would allow the Maryland Stadium Authority to issue up to $2.2 billion in bonds to pay for school construction projects.

In January 2021, Alsobrooks appointed former state delegate Juanita Miller as chair of the Prince George's County Board of Education. After ethics charges were filed against almost all members of the Prince George's Board of Education in August 2021, Alsobrooks asked the state's top school officials to "immediately" investigate the allegations. The Maryland State Board of Education said it was unable to review the ethics allegations made against the school board members, saying that the report is confidential "until accepted by the local board of education". In June 2022, Alsobrooks asked Miller to resign from the school board after the Maryland State Board of Education made public two charges against her.

In September 2021, Alsobrooks wrote to Gov. Hogan to express concern that none of the nominees to the state's education reform panel lived in Prince George's County. The panel refused requests to reopen applications, waiting for clarity from the Attorney General of Maryland.

In February 2022, Alsobrooks asked the Maryland General Assembly to pass legislation to allow the Prince George's County school board to return to an all-elected school board, with nine members elected by district and one student member.

Minimum wage
In 2019, Alsobrooks endorsed legislation in the Maryland General Assembly to raise the state's minimum wage to $15 an hour by 2023, saying "[n]o one jurisdiction can achieve this on its own, because unless each city and county adopts the $15 minimum wage, it will not be a viable solution".

National politics
Alsobrooks opposed the 2018–2019 government shutdown, calling it "wicked" and referring to President Donald Trump as "ruthless". In July 2019, Alsobrooks traveled to Detroit, Michigan to lend moral support to Kamala Harris during one of the televised presidential debates, bringing her teenage daughter along. In May 2020, Alsobrooks was named co-chair of the Maryland Women for Biden group, alongside State House Speaker Adrienne A. Jones, State Senate President Pro Tem Melony G. Griffith, and Maryland Democratic Party Chair Yvette Lewis.

Policing
In June 2020, Alsobrooks announced that the county would forgo expanding its police training facility, instead funding a $20 million public health facility to treat mental health and addiction. In July 2020, she established a Police Reform Task Force to come up with recommendations on public police reform. In February 2021, Alsobrooks announced that the county would implement the reforms recommended by the task force, including updates to the department's use of force policy and creating a new office of integrity led by an independent inspector general.

Electoral history

References

External links
 

|-

1971 births
20th-century African-American people
20th-century African-American women
21st-century African-American politicians
21st-century African-American women
21st-century American politicians
21st-century American women politicians
African-American lawyers
African-American people in Maryland politics
African-American women in politics
African-American women lawyers
Benjamin Banneker Academic High School alumni
Living people
Maryland Democrats
Prince George's County, Maryland Executives
Sanford School of Public Policy alumni
State's attorneys in Maryland
University of Maryland Francis King Carey School of Law alumni